Richard Nixon Berry (May 3, 1873 – September 17, 1956) was a Canadian dentist and political figure in Ontario. He represented Haldimand in the Legislative Assembly of Ontario from 1923 to 1926 and from 1929 to 1934 as a Conservative member.

He was born in Seneca township, the son of Nixon Berry and Eliza Jane Hassard. Berry was educated in Caledonia and at the Royal College of Dental Surgeons. In 1904, he married Harriette Esther Hind. Berry served as reeve for Caledonia from 1920 to 1923 and as warden for Haldimand County in 1923. He died in Hamilton in 1956.

References

External links

1873 births
1956 deaths
Progressive Conservative Party of Ontario MPPs
People from Haldimand County
Canadian dentists